Abish Kekilbayev (sometimes Kekilbayuly, Äbış Kekılbaiūly, ; 6 December 1939 – 11 December 2015) was a Kazakh National writer and politician who served as a Senator of Kazakhstan from 2002 to 2010, State Secretary of Kazakhstan from 1996 to 2002, and the Supreme Council Chairman from 1994 until its dissolution in 1995. 

During the Soviet period, Kekilbayev worked as literary writer in which his work have become a noticeable phenomenon in the literary life of Kazakhstan. He served as the Deputy Minister of Culture of the Kazakh SSR, the second secretary of Board of the Union of Writers, the head of department of the Central Committee of Communist Party of Kazakhstan, Head of the Records Office for Culture and Inter-Ethnic Relations of the Kazakh SSR Presidential Administration, the editor-in-chief of the Yegemen Qazaqstan newspaper, the literary employee of the Kazakh adebiety newspaper, the head of literature and art department of the Leninshyl jas newspaper editorial office.

Throughout his life Kekilbayev was recognized with several awards and titles such as Hero of Labour, National Writer of Kazakhstan, laureate of the State Prize, a philologist, academician of the Academy of Social Sciences, Emeritus Professor of Al-Farabi Kazakh National University and of the L. Gumilyov Eurasian State University.

Early life and career 
Born in the village of Ondy, Kekilbayev graduated from the philological faculty of the Al-Farabi Kazakh National University in 1962. He then began his career as a literary employee of the newspaper Qazaq adebieti.

From 1963 to 1965, he was the head of the department of literature and art of the editorial office of the newspaper "Leninshil zhas". Then he worked in the repertoire and editorial board of the Kazakh SSR Ministry of Culture. In the period from 1968 to 1970, Kekilbayev served in the Central Asian Military District in the ranks of the Soviet Army. During his service, he took part in the border conflict near Lake Zhalanashkol between Soviet border guards and Chinese military personnel.

After joining the Central Committee of the Communist Party of Kazakhstan in 1975, Kekilbaev published a number of essays in the spirit of communist propaganda. When discussing the new 1977 Constitution of the Soviet Union, he instead criticized the Constitution of the United States in the newspaper Socialist Kazakhstan where Kekilbaev wrote saying "Soviet people understand the draft of the new Constitution of the USSR as a new achievement of human thought in the persistent struggle for justice, as a new contribution to the consistent teaching of Marxism-Leninism." 

For the next five years, Kekilbayev was the chief editor of the script of the board of the Kazakhfilm Aimanov film studio. In this work, Kekilbayev put a lot of effort, effort and creative inspiration into the creation of screen versions of "Gray Fierce/Kok Serik", "Shot at the Kara Pass" by Mukhtar Auezov and other films, which are mutually recognized by Kazakh and Kyrgyz filmmakers as joint screen works. With his direct participation at this studio, films such "Kyz Zhibek", "The End of the Ataman", "Gray Lyuty/Kok Serik", "Trans-Siberian Express" and others, rightfully included in the golden fund of Kazakh cinematography and in the history of world cinema were created. By that time, Kekilbayev for a number of years was in charge of the fiction sector of the culture department of the Central Committee of the Communist Party of Kazakhstan. While working as the Kazakh SSR Deputy Minister, he put a lot of effort and effort into the construction of the Central State Museum of Kazakhstan, the Central Concert Hall and other cultural objects that significantly enriched the spiritual life and architectural appearance of Alma-Ata.

Working as the second secretary of the board of the Writers' Union of Kazakhstan, he carefully identified and nurtured a young creative shift of writers. Many of which are the pride of Kazakh literature today. He was twice elected a member of the board of the Union of Writers of the USSR, was elected a member of the international committee of Afro-Asian writers, a member of the jury of the international writers' prize "Lotus", a member of the board of the central book publishing houses "Khudozhestvennaya literatura" and "Friendship of Peoples". A fruitful period of his life was also the years when he was the chairman of the Presidium of the Central Council of the Kazakh Society for the Protection of Historical and Cultural Monuments, and headed the department of interethnic relations of the Central Committee of the Communist Party of Kazakhstan. During this period, thanks to the knowledge and efforts of Kekilbaev, historical monuments of Kazakhstan such as in Turkistan, Sayram, Otrar, Taraz, Mangystau, Shubartau, Atyrau gained worldwide fame. They were included in the route of the Silk Road expedition organized with the support of UNESCO. Kekilbaev enjoyed great authority and respect, deserved recognition of his colleagues and the general public, being the head of the referent for culture and interethnic relations of the Office of the President of the Kazakh SSR.

Political career

Member of the Supreme Council and Mazhilis (1990–1996) 
In 1990, Kekilbayev was elected as MP of the Supreme Soviet of the Kazakh SSR of the 12th Convocation from the Bayanaul electoral district No. 166 of Pavlodar region (having gained 52.6% of the votes, defeated two rivals), he headed the Committee on National Policy, Development of Culture and Language. With his direct participation, the Laws of the Republic of Kazakhstan "On the press and other mass media", "On the protection and use of historical and cultural heritage", "On freedom of religion and religious associations" and others were prepared and adopted. 

From April 1994 through May 1995, he was the Chairman of the 13th Supreme Council of Kazakhstan which put the prerequisites of further development of parliamentarianism in Kazakhstan. Kekilbayev noted that:"The creation of professional Parliament can be called without any stretch, one of the biggest events in the socio-political life of this year. Undoubtedly, his its work will enter the Kazakh historic calendar as one of the notable milestones in formation of new statehood and democracy… We have never had a professional Parliament and we have to act by the method of trials and errors… Gradually goes the crystallization of powers of the Supreme Soviet, possessing new status."On the eve of Kazakhstan independence, Kekilbayev addressed the issues of Kazakh language, onomastics, national history, socio-cultural aspects and international relations.

In May 1995, Kekilbayev was appointed State Advisor to the President of the Republic of Kazakhstan. In December 1995. he was elected as a member of the 1st Mazhilis. From there, he served as chairman of the Committee on International Affairs, Defense and Security.

In an interview published in 1995 in the Yegemen Qazaqstan newspaper, Kekilbayev told that  "I would not have come into politics if I were not a writer. I would not be an artist, I would not become a fighter. The problems that made me think as an artist are the problems that make me think as a citizen. How can I give up the opportunity to solve problems in real life when I solved them in an imaginary world?"

Later political career (1996–2010) 
From 30 October 1996 to 29 January 2002, Kekilbayev served as State Secretary of Kazakhstan. In 2002, he was an advisor to President Nursultan Nazarbayev. That same year, Kekilbayev was appointed member of the Senate of Kazakhstan and served in the Senate's 2nd, 3rd and 4th convocations. During his term, he became a member of the Asar political faction in the Parliament in 2004, a party led by Nazarbayev's daughter Dariga. When explained his decision, Kekilbayev responded saying “I became a member not of the Asar party, but of its faction. My goal is to bring real benefits in life and society through lawmaking, the direction of the Asar party is most consistent with this goal."

While working as a Senator, Kekilbayev was a member of National Council of the Republic of Kazakhstan, the Assembly of People of Kazakhstan, Organization of the Central Asian States as well as member of the group of cooperation with the United States Congress, House of Councillors of Japan, and Croatian Parliament.

In 2009, during the opening of the Qazaq Eli monument in front of the Palace of Independence, Kekilbaev praised Nazarbayev saying “our genius people know to whom they entrust their fate. The first president is a special president. The central figure of the white marble monument may well become the first president of Kazakhstan, Nursultan Nazarbayev, who is a symbol of our past filled with heroism, filled with the creation of today, full of bold undertakings of tomorrow."

On 11 March 2010, Kekilbayev was removed from the post as a Senator by the Decree.

Bibliography
Keklibayev several novels into Kazakh language such works as Guy de Maupassant "Pierre et Jean", "Une vie ou L'Humble Vérité," Chingiz Aitmatov's story "Cranes Fly Early" and participated in the translation of Leo Tolstoy's novel "War and Peace" and I.Bunin's works. 

"King Lear", "Romeo and Juliet" by Shakespeare, "Princess Turandot" by Carlo Gozzi, "On the Night of the Lunar Eclipse" by Mustai Karim, "Don Juan oder Die Liebe zur Geometrie" by Max Frisch and "Ghosts" by Henrik Ibsen were also translated by Kekilbayev and were included in the repertoires of Kazakh theatres.

Kekilbayev is the author of a collection of poems "Golden Rays" (1963) and a collection of stories "A Flock of Cloud" (1966), "Steppe Ballades" (1968), articles "Face to Face with Time", essays "Cranes", "Steppe Ballades", "Snow in March", "The Ballades of the Forgotten Years", "The End of a Legend" and "Pleiades - Constellations of Hopes."

Ballad of Forgotten Years is translated into English and published by Stacey International (London, UK). This book by Kazakhstan's most venerated writers in the bardic vein a prose ballad of the ancient rivalry between his Kazakh forebears and Turkmen neighbors on their illimitable sun-scorched (or snow-carpeted) steppe, in the unceasing nomadic contest for pasture, animals, and sometimes women.

Honours
Kekilbayev has been awarded the Order of the First President of the Republic of Kazakhstan Nursultan Nazarbayev and the Order of Otan for the significant contribution to the development of Kazakhstan.
 
President Nursultan Nazarbayev on the eve of the Independence Day awarded Kekilbayev the Highest State Title "Kazakhstannyn Enbek Eri" for his services to the country and contribution to the development of culture and literature, his active public activity. The head of state personally presented him this highest honor. Nazarbayev said that he presented the title to Kekilbayev at the solemn event devoted to his 70th anniversary. He stated that "his works as well as political and public activity represent his significant contribution to the strengthening of Independence, establishment of a new state, formation of high spiritual life of our society."

Kazakhstan
Hero of Labour, 2009
Orden Otan
Orden of the First President - Nursultan Nazarbayev  
Medal "Astana"
Medal "10 Years of the Independence of the Republic of Kazakhstan"
Medal "10th Anniversary of the Constitution of the Republic of Kazakhstan"
Medal "In Commemoration of the 100th Anniversary of the Railway of Kazakhstan"
Medal "10 Years of the Parliament of the Republic of Kazakhstan"
Medal "10 Years of the City of Astana"
Medal "20 Years of the Independence of the Republic of Kazakhstan"
Medal "20th Anniversary of the Constitution of the Republic of Kazakhstan"

Soviet Union
Order of the Badge of Honour, 1981

References

 Қазақстанның ашық кітапханасындағы Әбіш Кекілбайұлының шығармалары
 Link to official web-site

1939 births
2015 deaths
Al-Farabi Kazakh National University alumni
Academic staff of Al-Farabi Kazakh National University
Government ministers of Kazakhstan
Kazakhstani male writers
Members of the Senate of Kazakhstan